Tomás Bernardo Cavanagh (born 5 January 2001) is an Argentine professional footballer who plays as a left-back for Talleres, on loan from Vélez Sarsfield.

Career
Cavanagh joined the youth ranks of Vélez Sarsfield in 2015. He made the breakthrough into their first-team in 2020, with manager Mauricio Pellegrino selecting him to play in friendly matches against the likes of Nueva Chicago and Platense; he was sent off in the latter encounter. He was initially an unused substitute seven times before making his bow, including for three Copa Sudamericana fixtures. Cavanagh's senior debut did arrive on 5 December in the Copa de la Liga Profesional against Patronato, with the left-back coming on in place of Tomás Guidara for the final ten minutes of a 0–0 draw.

In January 2022, Cavanagh was loaned out to fellow league club Talleres de Córdoba with a purchase option, until the end of 2022.

Career statistics
.

Notes

References

External links

2001 births
Living people
People from General López Department
Argentine footballers
Association football defenders
Argentine Primera División players
Club Atlético Vélez Sarsfield footballers
Talleres de Córdoba footballers
Sportspeople from Santa Fe Province